Morteza Ahmadi Harandi ( born 21 May 1966) is an Iranian director in film and television. He next directed his account experience in screenwriting, editing, producing and teaching at the Iranian Young Cinema Society is having, he then acting and directing multi-Showand making handicrafts. film Without permission is The last film he directed in 2012 .

Directed

Films 
 Without permission (bedoon ejazeh) 2010 
 Parvin (Parvin Etesami) 2005 
 Inflammation (eltahab) 1994

Television 

 Telefilms Node (kheft) 1987
 Security alarm (Series) 1992
 for the last time (baray akharin bar) (Series) 1995
 Beyond the home (khaney ansooy rood) (Series) 1997
 Familiar Strangers (gharibe ashena) (Series) 1998 
 Empty frames (ghab hay khali) (series) 2006– 2007
 Gray Land (sarzamin e khakestari) (Series) 26 part 2001 -2001
 American lawyer Queen French (Tele drama) 2005
 The Last Empty Frame (akharin ghab khali) 2009
 Thirty-nine-week (39 hafte) (Series) 2014

Sarmstnd 
 Beyond Thought (mavaray andishe) (set) 8 part 1994
 Our Iran (iran ma) (set)90 part 1996
 Passengers of spring (losaferan e bahar) (set) 30 part 1997
 Here Iran (inja iran ast) (set) 120 part 1997
 What you have asked (set) 8 part 1998
 Immigrants of Green (mohajerin e sabz) (set) 8 part 1999
 September Song (ahang e mehr) 2001
 Portrait of a lasting (simay mandegar) (set) 19 part 2002
 Last thirsty zayande river (akharin zendeh zayande rood) 2003
 Love, Mirror, Ashura (eshgh,ayeneh,ashoora) (set) 13 part 2004

Producer 

 Telefilms Node (kheft) 1987 
 Inflammation (eltehab) (Movie) 1994
 The third puzzle (moamay sevom) (Movie) 1988 
 Light soil (khak e taban) (Series) 8 part 2005 
 Empty frames (ghab hay khali) (Series) 15 part 2007
 The Last Empty Frame (akharin ghab khali) (Movie) 2008  
 Helper (yavar) (telefilms) 2013 
 Taxi meters (telefilms) 2014
 Do not tell me scrap (be man nagoo ghoraze) (telefilms) 2014
 limousine (telefilms) 2014

Editor 

 Telefilms Node (kheft) 1987 
 inflammation (eltehab) (Movie) 1994
 Beyond the home (khaney ansooy rood) (Series) 1997 
 An island of dry land (jazirei dar khoshki) (Series) 20 part 1997
 a long day (yek rooz e toolani) 1998
 Dad shy (babay khejalati) (Series) 13 part 2004
 American lawyer "Queen French" (Tele drama) 2005
 Parvin (Movie) 2005
 The Last Empty Frame (akharin ghab e khali) (Movie) 2008
 Empty frames (ghab hay khali) (Series) 15 part 2007 
 Gray Land (sarzamin e khakestari) (Series) 26 part 2001 
 Freer from the sea (rahatar az darya) (Movie) 2011
 The third puzzle (moamay sevom) (Movie) 1988
 No home address (Movie) 2015

Scriptwriting 

 Insight (basirat) 1985
 Node (kheft) 1987
 Throne of love (sarir e eshgh) 1988  
 Police of warn (Series) 1991
 inflammation (eltehab) 1994
 for the last time (akharin ghab khali) (Series) 1995 
 Face friend (rokh e yar) 1998
 Empty frames (ghab hay khali) (Series) 15 part 2007 
 The third Twilight (sevomin sepide dam) 2010
 Born in Iran (motovald e iran) 1997
 The Last Empty Frame (akharin ghab e khali) (Movie) 2008 
 Neglect (gheflat) 2009 
 Greed (tamae) 2009
 The Narieh 2013

Rewrite the script 

 Empty frames (Series) 15 part 2007  
 Without permission 2010

Short film 

 Insight (basirat) 1986 
 Neglect (gheflat) 2009 
 Greed (tamae) 2009

Attending the festival 

 Fajr Film Festival 2010   
 Police Film Festival 2011

Gallery

See also
Iranian cinema

References

External links

 
 sourehcinema
 
 dramawiki
 persianhub.tv
 facebook harandi.morteza
 pages/morteza-harandi

1966 births
Living people
Iranian film directors
Iranian screenwriters
Film people from Isfahan
Iran Broadcasting University
Iranian television directors
Iranian editors
Iranian film producers
Actors from Isfahan